Johan Tobias Cronje (born 13 April 1982, in Bloemfontein) is a South African track and field athlete who specializes in the 1500 metres event. With a personal best of 3:31.93 he is the current South African record holder in the 1500 metres.

Competition record

Personal bests
Outdoor
800 m – 1:45.64 (Berlin 2013)
1000 m – 2:18.56 (Dubnica nad Váhom 2010)
1500 m –  3:31.93 (Rieti 2013) NR
One mile – 3:50.70 (Eugene 2014) NR
3000 m – 8:02.14 (Torino 2004)
5000 m – 13:59.52 (Germiston 2009)

Indoor
1000 m – 2:18.48 (Stockholm 2008)
1500 m – 3:37.49 (Karlsruhe 2014)

External links
 

1982 births
Living people
South African male middle-distance runners
Athletes (track and field) at the 2004 Summer Olympics
Olympic athletes of South Africa
World Athletics Championships medalists
Afrikaner people
Sportspeople from Bloemfontein
Athletes (track and field) at the 2014 Commonwealth Games
World Athletics Championships athletes for South Africa
South African Athletics Championships winners
Commonwealth Games competitors for South Africa
Athletes (track and field) at the 2007 All-Africa Games
African Games competitors for South Africa